Sandra Gould (July 23, 1916 – July 20, 1999) was an American actress, perhaps best known for her role as Gladys Kravitz on the sitcom Bewitched. Gould was the second actress to portray the role, debuting at the start of the third season.

Life and career
Gould was born in Brooklyn, New York. She began acting in films with an uncredited role in T-Men (1947), and was the Phone Operator in Romance on the High Seas (1948), Doris Day's debut film.  She appeared in several uncredited roles for the remainder of the decade, and received her first screen credit with The Story of Molly X (1949). During the same decade, Gould enjoyed a four-year run as Miss Duffy, the man-hungry daughter of the forever-unheard owner of radio's Duffy's Tavern.

In 1953, Gould appeared as a guest in an episode of Letter to Loretta with Loretta Young. In 1959 she played a secretary in the Academy Award-nominated Imitation of Life with Lana Turner and Juanita Moore. She continued to guest star in the 1950s and 1960s in such television series as I Love Lucy, I Married Joan, December Bride, Maverick, The Flintstones, The Twilight Zone, The Lucy Show, Burke's Law, I Dream of Jeannie; Love, American Style; Gilligan's Island, The Brady Bunch and Mister Ed. She played a prominent supporting role in the film The Ghost and Mr. Chicken in 1966. In 1963, Gould released a comedy single record entitled Hello Melvin (This Is Mama) as an answer to Allan Sherman's hit "Hello Muddah, Hello Fadduh".

In September 1966, Gould replaced her friend Alice Pearce, who had been battling ovarian cancer during the second season of the ABC-TV situation comedy Bewitched, and had died in March. The producers were undecided about what to do with the character of Gladys, so at first they had actress Mary Grace Canfield brought in to play Harriet Kravitz, Abner's sister, who was visiting him while his wife was visiting her mother. Soon after, Sandra Gould got the role of Mrs. Kravitz when actress-comedian Alice Ghostley turned down the role. 

In the role of Gladys, Gould's over-the-top performance and shrill voice were popular with viewers, and she succeeded ultimately in making the character her own. She remained with the series through its 7th season. The Kravitzes were referenced once in the final/8th season (ep 241 "Three Men and a Witch on a Horse") but the characters did not appear.  After Bewitched was cancelled in 1972, Gould reprised the role of Gladys five years later in a spin-off of the series, Tabitha. Gould also made appearances on Columbo, The Brady Bunch, Adam-12, Punky Brewster, Friends, and Veronica's Closet.

In 1961, Gould wrote the book Always Say Maybe, "a modern girl's guide to almost everything—but mostly men", published by Golden Press.

Personal life
Twice married, Gould was the widow of broadcasting executive Larry Berns and television/film director Hollingsworth Morse. With Berns she had one son, Michael Berns, in 1965. 

As a Democrat, she supported Adlai Stevenson in the 1952 presidential election. Gould adhered to Judaism.

Death
Gould died on July 20, 1999, in Burbank, California of a stroke following heart surgery, three days before her 83rd birthday. Upon her death, she was cremated and her ashes returned to her son.

Filmography

References

Bibliography

External links

American film actresses
American television actresses
American voice actresses
People from Brooklyn
Actresses from New York City
20th-century American actresses
1916 births
1999 deaths
California Democrats
New York (state) Democrats
Jewish American actresses
20th-century American Jews